Saracho is a surname. Notable people with the surname include:

Florencia del Saracho (born 1981), Mexican actress
Francisco Saracho Navarro (born 1963), Mexican politician
Jaime Fernández Saracho (born 1957), Mexican politician
Tanya Saracho, Mexican-American playwright and television writer